James Dundas VC (10 September 1842 – 23 December 1879) was a Scottish recipient of the Victoria Cross, the highest and most prestigious award for gallantry in the face of the enemy that can be awarded to British and Commonwealth forces.

Early life

He was born the son of George Dundas, Lord Manor a law lord in the Edinburgh High Court, and his wife Elizabeth Mackenzie on 10 September 1842 and baptised on 12 September. He was the older brother of William John Dundas FRSE (1849–1921). His early education was at Edinburgh Academy.

From 1855 to 1857 he attended Glenalmond School. He then attended Addiscombe Military Seminary for specific officer training for the British Army. In 1860 he was given a commission as a lieutenant in the Royal Engineers.

In 1862 he went with his regiment to India under General Henry Tombs VC, and rose to the level of Executive Engineer as part of a series of public works in the Bengal area.

Details of Award
Dundas was 22 years old, and a lieutenant in the Bengal Engineers, Indian Army during the Bhutan War when the following deed took place on 30 April 1865 at Dewan-Giri, Bhutan for which he was awarded the VC in a joint citation with Major William Spottiswoode Trevor:

The medal was presented to Dundas in Calcutta on 23 March 1868 by Major General C F Fordyce on behalf of Queen Victoria.

The medal forms part of the Ashworth Collection at the Imperial War Museum in London.

Later life

In March 1877, he had inherited the family estate of Ochtertyre, near Stirling in Scotland, from his uncle Sir David Dundas MP.  He returned to Britain briefly that year to inspect the property but returned to India after a few months.

In 1878 he is recorded as saving a man's life in a fire at the Simla bazaar.

Remaining in the army, Dundas died during the Second Anglo-Afghan War. General Roberts had selected him to lead a group advancing on Kabul. He was killed on 23 December 1879 during the Siege of the Sherpur Cantonment. He was killed by a British mine going off prematurely due to a makeshift fuse. He is buried nearby at the Seah Sang Cemetery in Afghanistan.

James Dundas died unmarried, and on his death the estate passed to his twin brother Colin Mackenzie Dundas.

Memorials

A brass memorial plaque exists in St Mary's Cathedral, Edinburgh (Episcopal).

A plaque also exists at Glenalmond School.

Listed on the "For Valour" memorial at the Royal Engineers Museum in Kent.

A memorial window and brass plaque in Rochester Cathedral.

In 2002 the Royal Engineers erected a new bridge in Afghanistan close to where he met his fate and named it the James Dundas Bridge.

Further information
"The Dundas Bridge", between Kabul and Bagram, Afghanistan, was named after him, by the British Army, Royal Engineers, following reconstruction work during 2002.

References

Monuments to Courage (David Harvey, 1999)
The Register of the Victoria Cross (This England, 1997)
The Sapper VCs (Gerald Napier, 1998)
Scotland's Forgotten Valour (Graham Ross, 1995)

External links
Royal Engineers Museum Sappers VCs

People educated at Edinburgh Academy
People educated at Glenalmond College
British recipients of the Victoria Cross
British Indian Army officers
Military personnel from Edinburgh
British military personnel of the Second Anglo-Afghan War
British military personnel killed in action
British military personnel of the Bhutan War
Bengal Engineers officers
1842 births
1879 deaths